Colonel Sir Robert Nigel Fitzhardinge Kingscote  (28 February 1830 – 22 September 1908) was a British soldier, Liberal politician, courtier and agriculturalist. He was generally known as Sir Nigel Kingscote.

Biography
Kingscote was the son of Colonel Thomas Henry Kingscote, of Kingscote Park, Gloucestershire, by his first wife, Lady Isabella Anne Frances, daughter of Henry Somerset, 6th Duke of Beaufort. His mother died when he was less than one year old, shortly after the birth of her second child, a daughter. His brother, Thomas Kingscote, also joined the Royal Household.

Military career
Kingscote was commissioned in to the Scots Fusilier Guards in 1846. He was Aide-de-Camp to his great-uncle, Lord Raglan, during the Crimean War, and later achieved the rank of lieutenant-colonel in the Royal Scots Fusiliers. He was appointed Honorary Colonel of the Royal North Gloucestershire Militia (later 4th (Militia) Battalion, Gloucestershire Regiment) on 28 January 1862 and retained the position until the unit's disbandment in 1908.

Political career
Kingscote was Member of Parliament for Gloucestershire West between 1852 and 1885. He was appointed Deputy Lord Lieutenant of Gloucestershire in 1856. The latter year he was appointed a Commissioner of Woods and Forests, a post he held until 1895. He was also a justice of the peace for Gloucestershire and Wiltshire and a Trustee of the manor of Horsley.

Court positions
Kingscote was a Groom-in-Waiting to Queen Victoria between 1859 and 1866, when he resigned, and as an Extra Equerry to the Prince of Wales in 1867. He served as Superintendent of the Prince of Wales's stables until 1885, was appointed to the Council of the Prince of Wales in 1886, and as Receiver-General of the Duchy of Cornwall in 1888, Extra Equerry to Edward VII between 1901 and 1902 and Paymaster-General of the Royal Household between 1901 and 1908.

He was appointed a Companion of the Order of the Bath in 1855, and a Knight Commander of the Order of the Bath in 1889. After the accession of King Edward VII, he was appointed a Knight Grand Cross of the Royal Victorian Order GCVO) in the November 1902 Birthday Honours, and was invested with the insignia by the King at Buckingham Palace on 18 December 1902.

Agriculture
Kingscote was also involved in agricultural affairs and served as President of the Royal Agricultural Society in 1878.

Family

Kingscote was twice married.

He married firstly the Hon. Caroline Sophia Wyndham, daughter of George Wyndham, 1st Baron Leconfield, in 1851. She died in childbirth on 19 March 1852 at Drove, Westhampnett in West Sussex: her newborn son died on the same day.

Kingscote married secondly Lady Emily Marie Curzon, daughter of Richard Curzon-Howe, 1st Earl Howe, in 1856. Lady Emily was a fellow courtier, serving as Lady of the Bedchamber to Queen Alexandra. They had two sons and two daughters. His eldest daughter, Harriet, married Arthur Wilson and was the mother of Field Marshal Henry Maitland Wilson, 1st Baron Wilson. His daughter Winifred married Lord Rocksavage, later Marquess of Cholmondeley, on 16 July 1879. Kingscote died in September 1908, aged 78. Lady Kingscote survived him by two years and died in December 1910.

References

External links
Caricature of Sir Robert Kingscote by Leslie Ward at the National Portrait Gallery
Photograph of Lady Kingscote and two of her children at thepeerage.com

External links 

 

1830 births
1908 deaths
Scots Guards officers
Gloucestershire Regiment officers
Gloucestershire Militia officers
English justices of the peace
Knights Commander of the Order of the Bath
Knights Grand Cross of the Royal Victorian Order
Equerries
Members of the British Royal Household
Liberal Party (UK) MPs for English constituencies
UK MPs 1852–1857
UK MPs 1857–1859
UK MPs 1859–1865
UK MPs 1865–1868
UK MPs 1868–1874
UK MPs 1874–1880
UK MPs 1880–1885